"We Loved It Away" is a song by George Jones and Tammy Wynette.  It was composed by George Richey and Carmol Taylor.

Background

"We Loved It Away" was released as a single in 1974 - the last before the couple's divorce in 1975 - and climbed to #8 on the Billboard country survey.  By the time of its release, George and Tammy's stormy marriage was common knowledge to the industry and fans alike, and their songs began to sound like commentaries that marked each new crisis and reconciliation, none more so than "We Loved It Away":

All my friends told me, we'd never make it
That love to you was just a game you played
And I'll admit at times we had rough goinBut in each other's arms, we loved it away

And I've been told, my love could never hold you
To tie it downs a price you'd never pay
And I'll admit there's times when you got restless
But in each other's arms, we loved it away

In the BBC documentary Tammy Wynette: Til I Can Make It On My Own, co-writer George Richey (who later married Wynette) recalled, "The writers who wrote for her, and there were about four of us who wrote regularly, would sort of write what was happening that day, and if she and Jones were having a tough time that's what we wrote about." The pair performed the song on the syndicated television show Pop! Goes the Country in 1974.

Chart performance

References

1974 songs
Songs written by George Richey
Song recordings produced by Billy Sherrill
Epic Records singles
George Jones songs
Tammy Wynette songs
Songs written by Carmol Taylor
Male–female vocal duets